The Fly Air Swallow is a Bulgarian ultralight trike, designed and produced by Fly Air Limited of Pravets. When it was available the aircraft was supplied as a complete ready-to-fly-aircraft.

Design and development
The aircraft is a "cozy" two seater, with the occupants both sitting very close together.

The Swallow features a cable-braced hang glider-style high-wing, weight-shift controls, a two-seats-in-tandem open cockpit with a cockpit fairing, tricycle landing gear and a single engine in pusher configuration.

The aircraft carriage structure is made from welded stainless steel tubing, with its single surface wing covered in Dacron sailcloth. Its  span wing is supported by a single tube-type kingpost and uses an "A" frame weight-shift control bar. The powerplant is a twin cylinder, air-cooled, two-stroke, dual-ignition  Rotax 503, with the liquid-cooled  Rotax 582 engine optional. Main landing gear suspension is provided.

The standard wings offered with the basic carriage were the La Mouette Ipsos series, in wing areas of 12, 14, 16 and 16.9 square metres.

Specifications (Swallow with La Mouette Ipsos 16 wing)

See also
Fly Air Trike Moster

References

Swallow
2000s Bulgarian sport aircraft
2000s Bulgarian ultralight aircraft
Single-engined pusher aircraft
Ultralight trikes